Muhammad Ramzan (Urdu: محمد رمضان) (born 25 December 1970) is a former Pakistani cricketer who played in one Test match in 1997.

Ramzan was a consistent player on the Pakistani domestic scene for a number of seasons most notably with United Bank Limited, Khan Research Labs and his home city Faisalabad. After many strong performances he was finally given his chance of a Test Match debut in 1997 alongside Azhar Mahmood and Ali Naqvi. He is considered by many within Pakistan cricket to have been unlucky not to have added to his single international cap.

Since moving to Scotland he has turned out as club professional for a number of clubs most notably Drumpellier, Poloc, Penicuik and Corstorphine.

References

1970 births
Living people
Pakistan Test cricketers
Faisalabad cricketers
Khan Research Laboratories cricketers
United Bank Limited cricketers
Pakistan Railways cricketers
Pakistan National Shipping Corporation cricketers
Pakistan Customs cricketers
Scottish cricket coaches
Cricketers from Faisalabad